Padma Shri Award, India's fourth highest civilian honours for 2010–2019.

Recipients

Explanatory notes

Non-citizen recipients

Posthumous recipients

References

External links
 
 

Recipients of the Padma Shri
Lists of Indian award winners
2010s in India
2010s-related lists